Frank Stephens (23 March 1899 – 11 March 1971) was an English-born Welsh rugby union and professional rugby league footballer who played in the 1920s and 1930s. Frank Stephens played for Wigan against Dewsbury in the first rugby league Challenge Cup Final to be held at Wembley Stadium, London in 1929.

Biography 
Frank Stephens was born in Drybrook, Gloucestershire but brought up in Blackwood, Monmouthshire. Prior to his Wigan rugby league career he had played rugby union for Bargoed, and subsequently joined Cardiff RFC in 1923. During this period he also played for Captain Crawshay's Welsh XV select tours from 1922 to 1925. His rugby league career started when invited to sign for Wigan RFC in 1925.

Playing career

International honours
Frank Stephens won a cap for Other Nationalities (RL) while at Wigan in the 20-27 defeat by England at Headingley Rugby Stadium, Leeds on Wednesday 20 March 1929, and won caps for Wales (RL) while at Wigan in the 34-8 victory over New Zealand at Taff Vale Park, Pontypridd on Saturday 4 December 1926, the 12-20 defeat by England at Central Park, Wigan on Wednesday 11 January 1928, the 15-39 defeat by England at White City Stadium, Sloper Road, Grangetown, Cardiff on Wednesday 14 November 1928, and the 10-26 defeat by Australia at Wembley Stadium, London on Saturday 18 January 1930.

County honours
Frank Stephens played  in Monmouthshire's 14-18 defeat by Glamorgan in the non-County Championship match during the 1926–27 season at Taff Vale Park, Pontypridd on Saturday 30 April 1927, and represented Glamorgan and Monmouthshire (RL) while at Wigan against Lancashire at Taff Vale Park, Pontypridd on Saturday 12 November 1927, against Cumberland at Recreation Ground?, Whitehaven on Saturday 20 October 1928, against Cumberland at Welsh White City Stadium, Sloper Road, Grangetown, Cardiff on Saturday 21 December 1929, and against Yorkshire at Parkside, Hunslet on Thursday 27 February 1930.

Championship final appearances
Frank Stephens played right-, i.e. number 12, in Wigan's 22-10 victory over Warrington in the Championship Final during the 1925–26 season at Knowsley Road, St. Helens on Saturday 8 May 1926.

County League appearances
Frank Stephens played in Wigan's victory in the Lancashire County League during the 1925–26 season.

Challenge Cup Final appearances
Frank Stephens played left-, i.e. number 11, in Wigan's 13-2 victory over Dewsbury in the 1928–29 Challenge Cup Final during the 1928–29 season at Wembley Stadium, London on Saturday 4 May 1929.

County Cup Final appearances
Frank Stephens played right-, i.e. number 12, in Wigan's 11-15 defeat by Swinton in the 1925–26 Lancashire County Cup Final during the 1925–26 season at The Cliff, Broughton on Wednesday 9 December 1925, and played right- in the 5-4 victory over Widnes in the 1928–29 Lancashire County Cup Final during the 1928–29 season at The Willows, Salford on Saturday 24 November 1928,

Genealogical information
Frank Stephens' marriage to Edna (née Morris) was registered during first ¼ 1928 in Wigan district. They had children; Enid L. Stephens (birth registered during second ¼ 1928 in Wigan district), Ronald A. Stephens (birth registered during third ¼ 1929 in Wigan district), and Marjorie Stephens (birth registered during first ¼ 1932 in Wigan district).

References

External links
Statistics at wigan.rlfans.com

1899 births
1971 deaths
Bargoed RFC players
Batley Bulldogs players
Cardiff RFC players
Crawshays RFC players
English people of Welsh descent
English rugby league players
English rugby union players
Glamorgan and Monmouthshire rugby league team players
Monmouthshire rugby league team players
People from Forest of Dean District
Rochdale Hornets players
Rugby league props
Rugby league second-rows
Rugby league players from Gloucestershire
Rugby union players from Gloucestershire
Wales national rugby league team players
Wigan Warriors players